Bangor Cricket Club is a cricket club in Bangor, County Down, Northern Ireland. There are 4 adult weekend XI's, all of which play in league and cup competitions within the Northern Cricket Union of Ireland.
In 2013 the 1st XI were promoted to NCU Senior League 1 and the 2nd XI were promoted to NCU Junior League 1.

Honours
NCU Senior League: 1
2004
NCU Junior Cup: †4 (2 shared)
†1983 (shared), †1990, †1999 (shared), †2004

† Won by 2nd XI

References

External links
Bangor Cricket Club

Cricket clubs in County Down
NCU Senior League members
Cricket clubs in Northern Ireland